In molecular biology, CD4 (cluster of differentiation 4) is a glycoprotein that serves as a co-receptor for the T-cell receptor (TCR). CD4 is found on the surface of immune cells such as T helper cells, monocytes, macrophages, and dendritic cells. It was discovered in the late 1970s and was originally known as leu-3 and T4 (after the OKT4 monoclonal antibody that reacted with it) before being named CD4 in 1984. In humans, the CD4 protein is encoded by the CD4 gene.

CD4+ T helper cells are white blood cells that are an essential part of the human immune system. They are often referred to as CD4 cells, T-helper cells or T4 cells. They are called helper cells because one of their main roles is to send signals to other types of immune cells, including CD8 killer cells, which then destroy the infectious particle. If CD4 cells become depleted, for example in untreated HIV infection, or following immune suppression prior to a transplant, the body is left vulnerable to a wide range of infections that it would otherwise have been able to fight.

Structure 

Like many cell surface receptors/markers, CD4 is a member of the immunoglobulin superfamily.

It has four immunoglobulin domains (D1 to D4) that are exposed on the extracellular surface of the cell:
 D1 and D3 resemble immunoglobulin variable (IgV) domains.
 D2 and D4 resemble immunoglobulin constant (IgC) domains.

The immunoglobulin variable (IgV) domain of D1 adopts an immunoglobulin-like β-sandwich fold with seven β-strands in 2 β-sheets, in a Greek key topology.

CD4 interacts with the β2-domain of MHC class II molecules through its D1 domain.  T cells displaying CD4 molecules (and not CD8) on their surface, therefore, are specific for antigens presented by MHC II and not by MHC class I (they are MHC class II-restricted). MHC class I contains Beta-2 microglobulin.

The short cytoplasmic/intracellular tail (C) of CD4 contains a special sequence of amino acids that allow it to recruit and interact with the tyrosine kinase Lck.

Function 
CD4 is a co-receptor of the T cell receptor (TCR) and assists the latter in communicating with antigen-presenting cells. The TCR complex and CD4 bind to distinct regions of the antigen-presenting MHC class II molecule. The extracellular D1 domain of CD4 binds to the β2 region of MHC class II. The resulting close proximity between the TCR complex and CD4 allows the tyrosine kinase Lck bound to the cytoplasmic tail of CD4 to phosphorylate tyrosine residues of immunoreceptor tyrosine activation motifs (ITAMs) on the cytoplasmic domains of CD3 to amplify the signal generated by the TCR. Phosphorylated ITAMs on CD3 recruit and activate SH2 domain-containing protein tyrosine kinases (PTK), such as ZAP70, to further mediate downstream signalling through tyrosine phosphorylation. These signals lead to the activation of transcription factors, including NF-κB, NFAT, AP-1, to promote T cell activation.

Other interactions 
CD4 has also been shown to interact with SPG21, and Uncoordinated-119 (Unc-119).

Disease

HIV infection 

HIV-1 uses CD4 to gain entry into host T-cells and achieves this through its viral envelope protein known as gp120. The binding to CD4 creates a shift in the conformation of gp120 allowing HIV-1 to bind to a co-receptor expressed on the host cell. These co-receptors are chemokine receptors CCR5 or CXCR4. Following a structural change in another viral protein (gp41), HIV inserts a fusion peptide into the host cell that allows the outer membrane of the virus to fuse with the cell membrane.

HIV pathology 
HIV infection leads to a progressive reduction in the number of T cells expressing CD4. Medical professionals refer to the CD4 count to decide when to begin treatment during HIV infection, although recent medical guidelines have changed to recommend treatment at all CD4 counts as soon as HIV is diagnosed. A CD4 count measures the number of T cells expressing CD4. While CD4 counts are not a direct HIV test—e.g. they do not check the presence of viral DNA, or specific antibodies against HIV—they are used to assess the immune system of a patient.

National Institutes of Health guidelines recommend treatment of any HIV-positive individuals, regardless of CD4 count Normal blood values are usually expressed as the number of cells per microliter (μL, or equivalently, cubic millimeter, mm3) of blood, with normal values for CD4 cells being 500–1200 cells/mm3. Patients often undergo treatments when the CD4 counts reach a level of 350 cells per microliter in Europe but usually around 500/μL in the US; people with less than 200 cells per microliter are at high risk of contracting AIDS defined illnesses.  Medical professionals also refer to CD4 tests to determine efficacy of treatment.

Viral load testing provides more information about the efficacy for therapy than CD4 counts. For the first 2 years of HIV therapy, CD4 counts may be done every 3–6 months. If a patient's viral load becomes undetectable after 2 years then CD4 counts might not be needed if they are consistently above 500/mm3. If the count remains at 300–500/mm3, then the tests can be done annually. It is not necessary to schedule CD4 counts with viral load tests and the two should be done independently when each is indicated.

Other diseases 

CD4 continues to be expressed in most neoplasms derived from T helper cells. It is therefore possible to use CD4 immunohistochemistry on tissue biopsy samples to identify most forms of peripheral T cell lymphoma and related malignant conditions. The antigen has also been associated with a number of autoimmune diseases such as vitiligo and type I diabetes mellitus.

T-cells play a large part in autoinflammatory diseases. When testing a drug's efficacy or studying diseases, it is helpful to quantify the amount of T-cells

on fresh-frozen tissue with CD4+, CD8+, and CD3+ T-cell markers (which stain different markers on a T-cell - giving different results).

See also 
CD4+ T cells and antitumor immunity

References

Further reading

External links 
 
 Mouse CD Antigen Chart
 Human CD Antigen Chart
 Human Immunodeficiency Virus Glycoprotein 120
 
 

Clusters of differentiation
Glycoproteins
Immunology
Protein domains
T cells